Major-General William Crosbie (c.1740 - 16 June 1798) was a British Army officer.

Military career
Crosbie was commissioned as an ensign in the 38th Regiment of Foot in 1757. He was promoted to lieutenant in 1759 and captain in 1769. After serving at the evacuation of Boston in March 1776 during the American Revolutionary War, he was promoted to major in 1778. Promoted to lieutenant colonel in 1781, he became commanding officer of the 22nd Regiment of Foot on promotion. He raised the 89th Regiment of Foot in December 1793 and was promoted to major-general in 1794.

Crosbie also served as colonel of the 89th Regiment of Foot from 1793 to 1795 and as colonel of the 22nd Regiment of Foot from 1795 to his death in 1798. He was also Member of Parliament for Newark from 1790 to 1796.

References

|-

|-

British Army major generals
1740 births
1798 deaths
South Staffordshire Regiment officers
British Army personnel of the American Revolutionary War
Cheshire Regiment officers
Royal Irish Fusiliers officers
British MPs 1790–1796
Members of the Parliament of Great Britain for English constituencies